FC WIT Georgia is a Georgian football team from Tbilisi. The team is sponsored by WIT Georgia Ltd (a subsidiary of the United States WIT, Inc.), a pet food, accessories, and human and veterinary pharmaceuticals import company. WIT stands for World Innovation Technologies. They play their home games at Mikheil Meskhi Stadium in Tbilisi.

In 2004, FC WIT Georgia won the Georgian Championship, qualifying them for the early stages of the UEFA Champions League. In 2009, they won the championship for the second time. In 2010, the team won the Georgian Cup for the first time. However, performance of WIT Georgia was faded after 2010–11 season and relegated to Pirveli Liga in 2014–15 season. In 2017–18, they finished second in the Erovnuli Liga 2 and secured promotion to the Erovnuli Liga.

History 
1997: Founded as FC WIT Georgia Tbilisi.

Honours 
Erovnuli Liga
 Winners (2): 2003–04, 2009
Georgian Cup
 Winners (1): 2010
Georgian Super Cup
 Winners (1): 2009

Current squad

European cups history

Managers 
 Elguja Gugushvili (1997–199?)
 Sergo Kotrikadze (March 8, 1999 – 2001)
 Nestor Mumladze (2006 – August 2009)
 Merab Kochlashvili (August 2009 – 2009)
 Gela Gomelauri (2009–2010)
 Merab Kochlashvili (July 16, 2010–??)
 Zurab Beridze (April 20, 2011 – March 11, 2012)
 Merab Kochlashvili (March 2012–1?)
 Zurab Beridze (April 1, 2013–1?)
 Merab Kochlashvili (June 1, 2013–)
 Tengiz Kobiashvili (2015–)

References

External links 
 

WIT Georgia Tbilisi
Association football clubs established in 1997
1997 establishments in Georgia (country)
WIT Tbilisi